Sanna av Skarði (born Súsanna Kathrina Jacobsen, April 19, 1876 – February 12, 1978) was a Faroese educator.

Sanna av Skarði was born in Tórshavn, the daughter of Jacob Jacobsen and Elsebeth Jacobsen née Djonesen. In 1901 she married Símun av Skarði, who co-founded the Faroese Folk High School together with Rasmus Rasmussen in Klaksvík in 1899. She taught together with her husband at the school. She died in Tórshavn at the age of 101.

Sanna and Símun were the parents of the journalist Sigrið av Skarði Joensen (1908–1975) and the linguist  (1911–1999).

In 2000, she was featured on a Faroese stamp together with her sister-in-law Anna Suffía Rasmussen. Aside from Ruth Smith's self-portrait, this was the first Faroese postage stamp depicting prominent women.

References

Faroese women
1876 births
1978 deaths
Faroese schoolteachers
People from Tórshavn
Women centenarians
Faroese centenarians